Prince Nandiyavat Svastivatana (also known as Nandiyavat Svasti) was a member of the Thai Royal Family and grandson to King Rama IV.

Education 
As a young man, Prince Nandiyavat graduated from Worcester Academy, Worcester, Massachusetts in 1927.

Political careers 
Prince Nandiyavat Svastivatana was appointed Deputy Minister of Foreign Affairs in the government of Prime Minister Thawan Thamrongnawasawat.

Ancestry

References 

Nandiyavat Svastivatana
Nandiyavat Svastivatana
Nandiyavat Svastivatana
Worcester Academy alumni
1909 births
1958 deaths
Nandiyavat Svastivatana
Nandiyavat Svastivatana